The Arnaud River (formerly known as the Payne River) is a river in Nunavik, Quebec, Canada, flowing from the low plateaux of the Ungava Peninsula through a series of glacial lakes to Ungava Bay. Its mean discharge is approximately 15 km³ per year, but the river flows only in the summer as it is frozen to several metres for the rest of the year. The total length of the river is about 377 kilometres, but there are several main channels in the upper reaches of the river, most of them unnamed and hardly sighted even by the native Inuit.

Most of the basin is almost totally barren owing to the harsh climate - the mean temperature is only about  even at the height of summer and continuous permafrost extends deep from only half a metre below the surface. The only vegetation is low shrubs at the lower levels, for no trees grow within the Arnaud basin even in the most sheltered sites, and the river freezes for too long to make hydroelectric development feasible.

Gallery

References

Rivers of Nord-du-Québec
Nunavik
Tributaries of Hudson Bay